Anuj Dass (born 4 January 1974) was an Indian cricketer. He was a right-handed batsman and right-arm off-break bowler who played for Himachal Pradesh. He was born in Himachal Pradesh.

Dass made his cricketing debut for Himachal Pradesh's Under-16 team during the 1990-91 Vijay Merchant Trophy, in which he played four matches. He made a single first-class appearance for the side, during the 1999-2000 season, against Jammu and Kashmir. From the lower-middle order, he scored 10 runs in the only innings in which he batted. He made two List B appearances during the season, scoring all but one of his runs in the second match in which he played.

References

External links
Anuj Dass at Cricket Archive 

1974 births
Living people
Indian cricketers
Himachal Pradesh cricketers